Allen House may refer to:

In the United States
(by state then city)
Allen House (Bon Secour, Alabama), listed on the NRHP
James Allen House (Bon Secour, Alabama), historic house, neighbor of Allen House (Bon Secour, Alabama)
Allen House (Monticello, Arkansas), listed on the National Register of Historic Places (NRHP)
W. H. Allen House, Spotville, Arkansas
Allen-Sommer-Gage House, Chico, California, listed on the NRHP in Butte County
Theophilus Allen House, Palo Alto, California
Allen House (Boulder, Colorado)
Stanley-Woodruff-Allen House, West Hartford, Connecticut
The Allen House (Westport, Connecticut)
Charles Allen House (Christiana, Delaware)
William Allen House, Elberton, Georgia, listed on the NRHP
John Quincy Allen House, Buford, Georgia
Bona Allen House, Buford, Georgia, listed on the NRHP in Gwinnett County
Willis Allen House, Marion, Illinois
G. W. S. Allen House, Mount Pleasant, Iowa
Allen House (Dyersville, Iowa)
Henry J. Allen House, Wichita, Kansas
J. B. Allen House (Chestnut Grove, Kentucky)
Col. R. T. P. Allen House, Frankfort, Kentucky, listed on the NRHP
John Allen House (Keene, Kentucky), listed on the NRHP
James Allen House (Lexington, Kentucky), NRHP-listed
Allen-Alexander House, Paris, Kentucky, listed on the NRHP
Carter Allen House, Smiths Grove, Kentucky, listed on the NRHP
Thomas Allen House, Smiths Grove, Kentucky, listed on the NRHP
John C. Allen House, Summersville, Kentucky, listed on the NRHP
B. M. Allen House, Union, Kentucky, listed on the NRHP
Allen House (Keachi, Louisiana), listed on the NRHP in De Soto Parish
Allen-Barringer House, West Monroe, Louisiana
Allen House (Lowell, Massachusetts)
Ethan Allen House and Gun Shop, Grafton, Massachusetts
Nathaniel Topliff Allen Homestead, Newton, Massachusetts
William Russell Allen House, Pittsfield, Massachusetts
Elisha Allen House, Rehoboth, Massachusetts
Abel Allen House, Weston, Massachusetts
Charles Allen House (Worcester, Massachusetts)
J. B. Allen House (Petoskey, Michigan)
Stephenson-Allen House, Enterprise, Mississippi, listed on the NRHP
Spratt-Allen-Aull House, Lexington, Missouri
Ayers-Allen House, Metuchen, New Jersey
Allen House (Shrewsbury, New Jersey)
Jacob C. Allen House, Hackettstown, New Jersey, listed on the NRHP
Henry Allen House, Moravia, New York
Allen-Beville House, New York, New York
Dr. A. H. Allen Cottage, Saranac Lake, New York
Allen-Mangum House, Grissom, North Carolina
Allen House (Burlington, North Carolina)
Lyman Allen House and Barn, Amanda, Ohio
Darlon Allen House, Wellington, Ohio
Dr. Peter Allen House, Kinsman, Ohio
Goodwillie-Allen House, Bend, Oregon
Allen-Madison House, North Kingstown
Zachariah Allen House, Providence, Rhode Island
Candace Allen House, Providence, Rhode Island
Stephen Allen House, West Greenwich, Rhode Island
Joel Allen House, Latta, South Carolina
Allen House (Clarksville, Tennessee), listed on the NRHP
Walter Granville Allen House, Cordova, Tennessee, listed on the NRHP
Allen-Bell House, Bastrop, Texas, listed on the NRHP
I. R. Allen House, Ennis, Texas, listed on the NRHP
Robert C. Allen House, Hearne, Texas, listed on the NRHP
Thomas L. Allen House, Coalville, Utah
J. R. Allen House, Draper, Utah
Dr. Samuel H. Allen House and Carriage House, Provo, Utah
Knight-Allen House, Provo, Utah
Sidna Allen House, Fancy Gap, Virginia
Ethan Allen Homestead, Burlington, Vermont
Nathan Allen House, Pawlet, Vermont
Allen House Hotel, Olympia, Washington, listed on the NRHP
Judge J. W. F. Allen House, Moorefield, West Virginia
Abram Allen House, Milton, Wisconsin

See also
Charles Allen House (disambiguation)
J. B. Allen House (disambiguation)
James Allen House (disambiguation)
John Allen House (disambiguation)